Uzere formerly known as "Uzei" is located in the Isoko South Local Government Area (LGA) of Delta State of Nigeria. It has become one of the largest petroleum oil producing communities in Nigeria. Oil exploration started in Uzere in 1957. Uzere has nine communities: Uhei, Ezede, Uweye, Afikioko (London Base), Uhroko (Paris), Ekregbesi, Abale, Iwre-Ezede, and Iboro.

Government
Monarchy: Ovie (king) who doubles as the chief priest of the Eni deity.

Climate
Uzere lies within the tropical rainforest belt with luxuriant vegetation. It experiences tropical wet and dry climate, with relatively constant temperatures throughout the course of the years.

Natural resources
Uzere is one of the largest oil producing communities in Nigeria. The Kingdom is also known for the production of groundnut, cassava and fish. There is a saying in Isoko that, "if you love fish, then marry an Uzere man."

Industries
Though, Uzere is known for oil exploration, it has recently developed into an industrial town with a cassava processing factory in Uwhroko community by the Local Government Authority.

Education
There are numerous public and private schools in Uzere. They include: Uzere Grammar School, St. Paul's Schools, Elite Academy, Uzere Primary School, Ogrih Primary School, and Eni Primary School.

Tourism
Uzere was a known tourist destination in Isoko, until December 4, 1903, when the Eni Lake "Court" was abolished by Colonial District officer Copland Crawford, calling it "trial by ordeal". The famous Eni Lake was a court for the trial of people accused of witchcraft.

Festivals
Eni festival is the most celebrated festival in the history of Uzere Kingdom. According to Utohware Udumubrai in his book, Uzere People and Culture in the Niger Delta, Eni festival "attracts people from all walks of life especially places where the people usually flock to Uzere to detect witchcraft...It is accompanied with much fanfare, music, cooking and eating of delicious native food. It also includes exchange of gifts". Other festivals are the annual Uzere Students' Reunion and Pageant, and the New Year's Eve Party usually hosted by Arube Dance Band of Uzere at the old market square in Uheri community.

Health
Uzere has a cottage hospital built and equipped by the Shell Petroleum Development Company and health centers.

References

Populated places in Isoko South